Francisco Pache Torres (born Higüey, Dominican Republic, July 18, 1949), better known by his stage name  'Ramón Torres' , is a Dominican singer-songwriter. He is considered to be one of the pioneers of modern Bachata for his role in redefining the genre by including romantic lyrics, guitar melodies, and implementation of new instruments such as the piano and the accordion.

Biography

Early years 
Ramón Torres was born on July 18, 1949, in Higüey, Dominican Republic, the son of Dominican parents (Ruperto Pache and Catalina Torres). Since he was 10 years old, he began working as an occasional laborer and took his last courses at night school.

Music career 
In 1987, as a result of his being liquidated from the free trade zone company, he moved to Santo Domingo where he recorded his first single «Las estrellas brillarán», under the label of Radio Guarachita by Radhamés Aracena. Some of his recorded songs were «The second letter, «With you until the end», «My great secret», «What are words for?», «You are mine», among others.

In 2019, during the People's Tour, El bachatero Romeo Santos took Ramón Torres as one of his guests to the city of La Romana, with whom he performed "Your Letters Come".

Discography

Studio albums 
 Love delicately (1990)
 I made her a woman (1994)
 My Saint John (2002)
 The king of bachateo (2002)
 If I had died yesterday (2014)
 Between yesterday and today (2014)
 Coffee with milk (2015)
 My successes (2016)

References

External links 

 Official Instagram
 Official Twitter
 Biography of Ramón Torres at BuenaMusica.com

1949 births
Living people
Bachata singers
Dominican Republic composers
20th-century Dominican Republic male singers
Dominican Republic songwriters
Male songwriters
21st-century Dominican Republic male singers